Into Invisible Light is a 2018 Canadian romantic drama film directed and co-written by Shelagh Carter and starring co-writer Jennifer Dale. Carter's third feature is an independent film loosely based on characters from Chekhov's Uncle Vanya, Dale's character being based on Yelena, and Keleghan's on Dr. Astrov. The film features an original score by Shawn Pierce.

Cast

Release and reception
Into Invisible Light premiered at the Whistler Film Festival on 1 and 2 December 2018, and the rest of Canada on 1 February 2019 at Scotiabank theatres in Winnipeg and Toronto.

Accolades
Awards
52nd WorldFest-Houston International Film Festival, 2019 • Platinum Remi (Shelagh Carter) • Gold Remi Best Actress (Jennifer Dale)
Italian Contemporary Film Festival (Toronto), 2019 • Special Achievement - Best Actress (Jennifer Dale)
West Europe International Film Festival (Brussels), 2019 • Best Film • Best Lead Actor (Peter Kelleghan) • Best Supporting Actress (Kari Matchett)

Nominations
Whistler Film Festival, 2018: official selection for the Borsos Competition for Best Canadian Feature
Madrid International Film Festival, 2019 • Best Film • Best Director • Best Lead Actress (Jennifer Dale) • Best Supporting Actress (Kari Matchett)
West Europe International Film Festival 2019 • Fusion Award, Best Cinematography (Ousama Rawi) • 5 other Jury Award nominations

Notes

References

External links
Official trailer on YouTube
Interview with Shelagh Carter at West Europe International Film Festival in Brussels on YouTube
Into Invisible Light on IMDb
Into Invisible Light on Rotten Tomatoes

2018 films
Canadian romantic drama films
English-language Canadian films
Films about literature
Films about the arts
2018 romantic drama films
2010s English-language films
2010s Canadian films